ONO, Ono or Ōno may refer to:

Places

Fiji 
 Ono Island (Fiji)

Israel 
 Kiryat Ono
 Ono, Benjamin, ancient site

Italy 
 Ono San Pietro

Ivory Coast 
 Ono, Ivory Coast, a village in Comoé District

Japan 
 Ōno Castle, Fukuoka
 Ōno District, Fukui
 Ōno District, Gifu
 Ōno District, Ōita
 Ōno, Chita District, Aichi
 Ōno, Fukui
 Ono, Fukushima
 Ōno, Gifu
 Ōno, Hiroshima
 Ōno, Hokkaidō
 Ono, Hyōgo
 Ōno, Ibaraki
 Ōno, Iwate
 Ōno, Ōita
 Ōno River, in Ōita Prefecture

United States 
 Ono Island (Alabama)
 Ono, California
 Ono, Kentucky
 Ono, Pennsylvania
 Ono, Wisconsin

People and language
 Ono (surname), including a list of people bearing the name
Ono language

ONO
 The FAA identifier of Ontario Municipal Airport in Ontario, Oregon
 Organization of News Ombudsmen (ONO)
 ONO (Spain), a Spanish cable company
 ONO Estadi, a football stadium in Mallorca, Spain, named for the cable company
 ONO, the name Yoko Ono uses for releasing remixes of her own work
 ONO (band), an experimental music group from Chicago

Other uses 
 Ono (P2P), a peer-to-peer file transfer system to find nearby peers
 Ono (weapon), a Japanese axe
 , the name of a number of United States Navy ships
 Ono, an alternate name for the Wahoo, a fish found in Hawaiian waters
 Ono (more precisely O'NO 99) was a 1970s card game similar to Uno
 Ono, a character in the animated television series The Lion Guard

See also 
 Ohno's hypothesis, an alternate name for the 2R hypothesis, named for Susumu Ohno
 Oh No (disambiguation)